First Degree was a 9-part drama series made by BBC Wales which aired in 2002. The series followed the lives, trials and tribulations of students in the fictional Bay College, one of several hi-tech media schools owned and run by an enigmatic entrepreneur based in Sacramento, California known only as The Founder. A Big Brother-style virtual eye roves to every corner of the campus 24 hours a day, tracking student movements, while lecturers control their destinies by hatching underhand plots.

Cast 
 Adam Randall as Gethin
 Adam Allfrey as Steffan
 Jade Capstick as Rachel
 Nicholas Aaron as Sion
 Salima Saxton as Rehema
 Victor Spinetti as The Founder
 Caroline Hayes as Johanna
 John Moraitis as Principal Maurice
 Phil Read as Ioan
 Anita Reynolds as Sarah
 Amanda Rawnsley as Maddy
 Sarah Farooqui as "Taz"
 Abhin Galeya as Jay
 Jonjo O'Neill as "Cookie"

External links 
 

BBC press release

BBC television dramas
2000s British drama television series
2002 British television series debuts
2002 British television series endings
2000s Welsh television series